West Bengal is the primary business and financial hub of Eastern India.  The state primarily dependent on agriculture and medium-sized industry. West Bengal have Jute industry, Tea industry. West Bengal is rich in minerals like coal.  

Since the independence of India, The Green Revolution bypassed the state. However, there has been a significant spurt in food production since the 1980s.

Agriculture and Livestock

Agriculture accounts for the largest share of the labour force. It contributed around 18.7% to the gross state domestic product (GSDP) in 2009–10. A plurality of the state's population are peasant farmers.

Major produce
Rice and potato are considered to be the principal food crops. The state is the largest source of the important food crop of rice, a staple diet across India, with an annual output of around 16.1 million tonnes in FY 2015–16, and the second-largest producer of potatoes in India with an average annual output of 11 million tonnes in FY 15. West Bengal is also the second-largest fish producing state.

Apart from these, jute, sugarcane and wheat are the top crops of the state. Other major food crops include maize, pulses, oil seeds, wheat, barley, and vegetables. Tea is another important cash crop. Darjeeling is globally recognised for tea plantation of the acclaimed Darjeeling tea variety.

Given below is a table of 2015 national output share of select agricultural crops and allied segments in West Bengal based on 2011 prices

It is also the second largest tea-producing state in India, producing 329.3 million kg of tea in 2014–15, accounting for 27.8 percent of the country's total tea production. In 2015–16, West Bengal produced approximately 2.38 mt of sugarcane and 3.1 mt of fruits. The state is the largest vegetables producing state in India with 25466.8 thousand MT of production in 2012–13.

West Bengal accounts for nearly 10% of the country's edible oil production. The state produced a total of 1.63 million tonnes of fish in 2015-16 compared to a production of 1.61 million tonnes during 2014–15, retaining second spot after Andhra Pradesh in fish production. West Bengal produced around 4961 thousand tonnes of milk in FY14-15.

The state is the third largest meat producing state in the country (including poultry) after Uttar Pradesh and Andhra Pradesh, producing 0.648 million tonnes of meat in 2012-13 and it is the largest producer of goat meat.

Industry

State industries are mostly localised in the Kolkata region, the mineral-rich western highlands, and Haldia port region. There are up to 10,000 registered factories in the state and the West Bengal state government has opened Shilpa Sathi, a single window agency in order to provide investors with all kinds of assistance in establishing and running industrial units. Kolkata is noted as one of the major centres for industries including the jute industry. There are numerous steel plants in the state apart from the alloy steel plant at Durgapur. The centre has established a number of industries in the areas of tea, sugar, chemicals and fertilisers. Natural resources like tea and jute in and nearby parts have made West Bengal a major centre for the jute and tea industries. West Bengal is at the forefronts of leather processing and leather goods manufacturing and has around 666 units producing leather and leather related goods. Currently, 22-25 percent of India's tanning activity is undertaken in Kolkata and its suburbs. Kharagpur has also numerous industries of various types such as iron works, cement, chemicals, etc.
The state's share of total industrial output in India was 9.8% in 1980–81, declining to 5% by 1997–98. However, the service sector has grown at a rate higher than the national rate.

Infrastructure

Power and energy

As of end of May 2016, according to data released by Central Electricity Authority on its site cea.nic.in, the installed power capacity of the state is 9984.4 MW, compared to 303.083 GW of the country. Of the total installed power capacity, 8523.83 MW was contributed by thermal power, 1,328.3 MW was contributed by hydro power and renewable power together.
West Bengal government's ministry of power, in its report, enumerates individual power generating stations in West Bengal along with their respective locations and generating capacities while mentioning the total installed capacity as 13826 MW . As of end of April 2016, 37449 out of 37463 villages, i.e. 99.96℅ of inhabited villages in West Bengal were cumulatively electrified.

Communication and transportation
Of this, national highways constitute  and state highways . , the central government mulled augmenting the state's national highways' length by another couple of thousand kilometres in a bid to supplement to India's plan of seamless BBIN connectivity through Nepal, Bhutan, India, and Bangladesh, subject to availability of land, by investing in the tunes of US$4–5 billion.

Railways
The Eastern railways zone, southeastern railways zone and N.F railway zone of Indian Railways run operations in West Bengal. At the end of 2014–15, the route length in West Bengal was 4070 km of which around 4000 km has been converted to broad gauge and around 2500 km has been electrified, the running track length was 7122 km and the total track length was 10,466 km, with the number of stations exceeding 800. Kolkata Metro railway is the newest zone of the IR with a single operational link of 27 km route length, 17 km of which runs underground. , various other metro links of approximately 120 km route length are underway in different phases of construction in Kolkata.

Ports
Kolkata is a major river-port in eastern India. The Kolkata Port Trust manages both the Kolkata docks and the Haldia docks. There is passenger service to Port Blair on the Andaman and Nicobar Islands and cargo ship service to ports in India and abroad, operated by the Shipping Corporation of India. Kolkata Port handled 50.195 million tonnes (mt) of traffic in 2015–16, around 8.43% higher vis-a-vis that handled during previous fiscal. Kolkata Dock System, the first major dock formally commissioned in 1870, handled cargo traffic of 16.688 mt in 2015–16, registering a significant growth of 9.2% over the previous year. Haldia Dock Complex, the 1st green port of the country in 2015, handled 33.507 mt in 2015–16, recording growth of 8.05% over the last year. In container traffic also, KoPT recorded 6,62,891 TEUs in 2015–16, clocking upwards of 5% growth over last year, and retained its 3 rd rank amongst major container handling Ports in the country. KDS also achieved the highest ever container throughput of 5,77,749 TEUs in 2015–16, a significant growth of 9.39% over the last year. Kolkata Dock System handled a traffic of 12.540 million tonnes in 2010–2011 as against 13.045 million tonnes in 2009–2010. At Haldia Dock Complex, 35.005 million tonnes of traffic was handled in 2010–2011 as against 33.378 million tonnes in 2009–2010 implying an increase of 4.87%.

Inland waterways
The 560 km long Haldia- Farakka stretch in West Bengal is part of the stretch of Ganges between Haldia and Prayagraj declared as the National Waterway (NW1). Also a 91 km long stretch of the NW5 is within West Bengal. West Bengal government has sought to build infrastructure to begin sustained fuel efficient cost efficient and eco-friendly shipping operations for cargo transportation and tourism, passenger traffic as well along 12 rivers in West Bengal which can reduce congestion on roads. These rivers that has been identified for national waterways services, are the Prayagraj-Haldia stretch of the Ganga Bhagirathi Hooghly river, Ajoy river (96 km), Bakreswar Mayurakshi river (110 km), Damodar river (135 km), DVC canal (130 km), Dwarekeswar river (113 km), Icchamoti river (634 km), Jalangi river (131 km), Rupnarayan river (72 km), Subarnarekha river (314 km) and Sunderban Waterways (201 km).

Telecommunications
As of end of April 2016, as per statistics published in press release of TRAI, there were 74.58 million wire-less (mobile phone) subscriptions (including 25.04 million with 90.43℅ VLR or active connections in Kolkata service area and 49.54 million with 93.69% VLR or active connections in rest of west Bengal service area) compared to over 1034.25 million wire-less connections in the whole country with VLR or active connections of 90.31% and 1.275 million wire-line subscriptions (including 0.909million in Kolkata and 0.365 million in rest of West Bengal) in West Bengal (with a total state-level tele-density of -----% ) compared to over 25.036 million wire-line connections in the whole country (with nationwide total tele-density of 83.32%) while as of April 2016 the number of broadband subscriptions in the state were arbitrarily estimated to be around 11 million compared to that of whole of India with over 151.09 million broadband connections.
VSNL has its international gateway and earth station in Kolkata. International connectivity is provided through VSNL and five STPI (Software Technology Parks of India) earth stations in Kolkata, Durgapur, Kharagpur, Haldia and siliguri. Digha has been selected as the cable landing station for the submarine cable laying project connecting India and South East Asia.
BSNL has an optical fiber network of 15000 km route in West Bengal. Reliance group's Jio Infocomm has laid 4500 km of optical fiber network in the state for its 4G network. Under National Optic Fibre Network (NOFN) mission, optical fibre cable will be laid in 341 blocks covering most of the gram panchayats in West Bengal.

Aviation

Spread over 2640 acres at Dumdum in Kolkata, the largest in eastern India, the newly modernised Netaji Subhas Chandra Bose International Airport is the fifth busiest international airport in India in respect of aircraft movement (after Delhi, Mumbai, Bangalore and Chennai).  It has two asphalt runways, the primary one extended by 700 meters (3627×50m) and upgraded to CATIIIB, and the secondary one (2790×46m) upgraded to CATII ILS standards.  Its terminal is a new and sprawling L-shaped six-level integrated terminal of over 2,510,000 sq ft inaugurated in 2013, able to handle 25 million passengers per annum.  It includes check-in counters that use CUTE (Common User Terminal Equipment) technology, 78 immigration counters, 12 customs counters, passenger lounges provided by Air India and Jet Airways, 18 aerobridges, 57 remote parking bays, 2 underground two-leveled carparks and car parking facilities in landscaped area capable of handling 5000 cars.  The airport has a Centre for Perishable Commodities (CPC), two luxury hotels and a shopping mall.

In the fiscal year April 2015 to March 2016, the airport handled 76722 aircraft movements including 14564 international aircraft movements, 12.42 million passengers (including 2.22 million international passengers and 10.2 million domestic passengers), 105390 tonnes of freight (including 37623 tonnes international freight). Between the 1940s and 1960s, major airlines such as Aeroflot, Air France, Alitalia, Cathay Pacific, Japan Airlines, Philippine Airlines, KLM, Pan Am, Lufthansa, Swissair and SAS operated from the airport.

With the advent of longer haul aircraft and the socio-economio-political degeneration of the state during the 1960s, several airlines gradually discontinued operations there. The withdrawal of Lufthansa's service to Frankfurt in 2012 left Kolkata with no direct flights beyond Asia. Kolkata airport is to undergo the execution of Phase 2 of the expansion plan which primarily involves the construction of an 86-meter ATC Tower. Additionally, the current Kolkata Metro expansion plans include two new lines to the airport for better connectivity.

Bagdogra airport near Siliguri is another significant airport in the state. Kazi Nazrul Islam Airport, country's first private greenfield aerotropolis project spread over 650 acres, under Bengal Aerotropolis Projects Limited (BAPL) co-owned by Singapore-based Changi group, conceived in 2006–07 to be a domestic/international airport with handling capacity of 1 million per annum that can be expanded to 2.5 million per annum in future, officially commenced operations in 2015 at Andal, 185 km away from the state capital Kolkata. , the fledgling project is still suffering from birth pangs as it strives to attract airliners, grappling with dire paucity of adequate number of fliers necessary to sustain flying operations from here, in the investment starved ambience prevailing in its immediate hinterland.

Industry

, the state has 22 formally approved special economic zones (SEZ). Of these, 17 are related to information technology (IT) or IT, enabled services (ITES).

Economic indices

As per the state budget presented in the state legislative assembly on 24 June 2016, West Bengal's nominal GSDP at current prices has risen to INR 9.20083 trillion or US$140.68 billion in the year 2015–16, the average INR to US$ exchange rate in that year being INR 65.4. West Bengal's average population in that year being 95.5 million, per capita nominal GSDP at current prices for the economic year 2015-16 can be calculated as US$1473. In terms of nominal net state domestic product (NSDP) at factor cost at current prices (base year 2004–2005), West Bengal was the sixth largest economy in India, with an NSDP of INR 7289.74billion or US$120.93 billion in 2014-15 and in terms of nominal gross state domestic product (GSDP) at current prices, the state had GSDP of US$132.86 billion in the economic year 2014-15 as mentioned by India Brand Equity Foundation. India's Purchasing power parity conversion factor and US$ to INR exchange rate in 2014-15 being 16.98 and INR61.11 respectively, west Bengal's GSDP (PPP) at market prices in 2014-15 can be calculated as international $478.16 billion for 2014–15. In the period 2004–2005 to 2009–2010, the average gross state domestic product (GSDP) growth rate was 13.9% (calculated in Indian rupee term), lower than 15.5%, the average for all states of the country. The state's nominal per capita NSDP at factor cost at current prices (base year 2004–05) was INR78903 or US$1291 in 2014–15, average dollar exchange rate being INR61.11 that economic year, improved from US$553.7 in 2004–05, but lower than the national nominal per capita NDP at current prices (base year 2012–13) of INR102839.47 or US$1683(INR to US$ exchange rate in 2014-15 being INR61.11), in 2014–15. West Bengal's nominal per capita GSDP at current prices in 2014-15 was US$1412, the state's estimated average population over 2014-15 being around 94.3millions. In 2009–10, the tertiary sector of the economy (service industries) was the largest contributor to the gross domestic product of the state, contributing 57.8% of the state domestic product compared to 24% from primary sector (agriculture, forestry, mining) and 18.2% from secondary sector (industrial and manufacturing). At a compound annual growth rate of 15.2%, the tertiary sector has been the fastest growing among the three sectors from 2004–05 to 2009–10. The growth has been driven by trade, hotels, real estate, finance, insurance, transport, communications and other services.

District-wise Economic Indicators 
The following is a list of basic economic data for the districts of West Bengal -2014, the latest year for which data is available:

Foreign direct investment
Under the overall guidance and policies of the government of India, the West Bengal government welcomes foreign technology and investments as may be appropriate for the needs of the state and is mutually advantageous. Foreign direct investment has mostly come in the manufacturing and telecommunication sectors. According to the Department of Industrial Policy & Promotion, Government of India, the cumulative FDI inflow in Kolkata Reserve Bank region (comprising West Bengal, Sikkim, Andaman and Nicobar Islands) from April 2000 to September 2016 amounted to US$  3967 million. Kolkata Reserve Bank region was seventh among the reserve bank regions of the country in terms of amount of cumulative FDI, behind Mumbai, New Delhi, Bangalore, Ahmedabad, Chennai and Hyderabad regions.

Exports
West Bengal is one of the country's leading exporters of finished leather goods. In 2009–10, the state accounted for around 13.5% of the country's exports of leather and leather products. The state accounted for around 70% of India's dried flower exports in 2008–09. The state is also a leading exporter of shrimps and tea.

However, the rapid industrialisation process has given rise to debate over land acquisition for industry in this agrarian state. NASSCOM–Gartner ranks West Bengal power infrastructure the best in the country.

Further reading 
 Bahl, R., Sethi, G., & Wallace, S. (2009). West Bengal: Fiscal Decentralization to Rural Governments: Analysis and Reform Options (No. paper0907). International Center for Public Policy, Andrew Young School of Policy Studies, Georgia State University.

References

External links
 Finance Department, Government of West Bengal